Taylor Christian Mosby is an American actress and musician from Tulsa, Oklahoma. She is known for her parts in The Last O.G., Breakthrough, and Thunder Force. She has also portrayed a younger Miranda Bailey in Grey's Anatomy.

Filmography

Film

Television

References

External links
 
 

Actresses from Tulsa, Oklahoma
African-American child actresses
American child actresses
2002 births
Living people
21st-century African-American people
21st-century African-American women